Humphrey Butler may refer to:

 Humphrey Butler, 1st Earl of Lanesborough (c. 1700–1768), Irish MP and peer
 Humphrey Butler (1767–1837), Irish MP for Donegal